Menelaus (Menelaos) was a local ruler of Pelagonia, honoured as euergetes ("benefactor") of Athens in 363 BC, for helping Athenians in the war against Amphipolis and the Chalcidian League. In the decree it is stated that not only Menelaus himself but also his ancestors were benefactors of Athens. Soon after, he probably fled to Athens and received Athenian citizenship and is the "Menelaus, son of Arrhabaeus" honoured as Athenian proxenos in Troy (~ 359 BC) and the Menelaus, commander of the cavalry against Philip II of Macedon mentioned by Demosthenes.

References
IG II² 110 Athens 363 BC
IMT Skam/NebTaeler Ilion 359 BC
Greek Historical Inscriptions, 404-323 BC by P. J. Rhodes (2007), Robin Osborne, pages 192–196, 

Pelagonia
Upper Macedonians
4th-century BC Greek people
Proxenoi
Metics in Classical Athens